Antonio Bonet may refer to:
 Antoni Bonet i Castellana (1913–1989), Catalan architect, designer and urban planner
 Antonio Bonet (footballer) (1908–1993), Spanish footballer

See also
 Bonet (disambiguation)